Christopher or Chris Marshall may refer to:

 Christopher Marshall (revolutionary) (1709–1797), Irish-born leader in the American Revolution
 Christopher Marshall (doctor) (1949–2015), British cancer biologist
 Christopher Marshall (composer) (born 1956), New Zealand classical music composer
 Chris Marshall (DJ) (born 1991), American DJ and producer better known by his stage name Crizzly

See also
 Kris Marshall (born 1973), English actor